WZNJ (106.5 FM, The River) is an American radio station licensed to serve the community of Demopolis, Alabama. Since August 2011, the station has been owned by Westburg Broadcasting Alabama, LLC.  It previously aired a classic hits music format branded as "The River". On June 3, 2015, it flipped to Urban Contemporary and Urban Oldies, under the same River branding. Syndicated programming includes ''The Steve Harvey Morning Show Monday-Saturday.
The station was assigned the "WZNJ" call sign by the U.S. Federal Communications Commission (FCC) on August 4, 1986.

References

External links

ZNJ
Urban contemporary radio stations in the United States
Marengo County, Alabama
Radio stations established in 1975
1975 establishments in Alabama